The Old Synagogue in Canterbury is considered to be the best example of an Egyptian Revival synagogue.

History

Community
The earliest record of a Jewish community in Canterbury dates from 1160. The community is known to have been prosperous and to have traded in corn (grain) and wool as well as banking. Despite pogroms in 1261 and 1264, the community flourished until the Edict of Expulsion, given by Edward I of England in 1290. Its presence is commemorated in the street name, Jewry Lane.

A modern Jewish Community is known to have existed in Canterbury by 1720. The present building was designed by Canterbury architect, a Christian gentleman named Hezekiah Marshall, and constructed in 1846–48 to replace a 1763 building torn down to make place for the new railway built by the South Eastern Railway Company. The cornerstone was laid by Sir Moses Montefiore in September 1847. A pair of columns with lotus capitals flank the doorway of the simple building, 40' by 27' by 30' high. The building is made of Portland cement, which gives the appearance of granite. There is a central bimah, the columns of which boast lotus-leaf capitals, and a women's balcony supported by Egyptian-style obelisks. The mikveh was described as "a miniature brick-faced temple set in the garden behind the synagogue". It is the only Egyptian Revival mikveh known to exist. The site is known to have been a hospice of the Knights Templar in medieval times.

In the earliest part of the 20th century, dwindling membership forced the synagogue to close. It is understood that regular services ceased in c.1911, with the premises eventually being sold off.

The King's School
In 1982, The King's School, Canterbury purchased the Old Synagogue, and it currently serves as the school's music recital hall. Members of the school's Jewish society gather at the Old Synagogue regularly for brief, informal Friday evening Shabbat meetings.  

Since purchasing the Old Synagogue, The King's School has allowed the small local Jewish community occasional use of the premises. In recent years, events such as Passover Seders, Sukkoth, Purim and other social activities, as well as a Jewish wedding, have been held on the grounds. In 2011, a Shabbat morning service and Torah reading was led by members of the University of Kent's Jewish Society and the university's Chabad Jewish Chaplain. 

Although several synagogues and churches were built in the Egyptian revival style in the early nineteenth century, only a few are known to survive, they include the Hobart Synagogue in Tasmania the Downtown Presbyterian Church, Nashville, Tennessee and the First Presbyterian Church (Sag Harbor), New York.

References

External links
 Canterbury's Medieval Jewish Community on Jewish Communities and Records - UK (hosted by jewishgen.org).
 Canterbury Old Synagogue on Jewish Communities and Records - UK (hosted by jewishgen.org).
 Image
 Image

Canterbury
Canterbury
Canterbury
Buildings and structures in Canterbury
History of Canterbury
Religion in Kent
Music venues in Kent
Religious buildings and structures in Kent
Synagogues completed in 1848